John Kinder Labatt (1803 – 26 October 1866) was an Irish-Canadian brewer and the founder of the Labatt Brewing Company.

Life and career
He was born in Queen's County (now County Laois), Ireland, to Valentine Knightley Chetwode Labat (1761–1813), an Irish-Huguenot, and Jane Harper Labat. Little is known of his early years.

Labatt immigrated to Canada in the 1830s and initially established himself as a farmer near London, Upper Canada. In 1847, he invested in a brewery with a partner, Samuel Eccles, launching "Labatt and Eccles". When Eccles retired in 1854, Labatt acquired his interest and renamed the firm the "London Brewery". He was assisted by his sons Ephraim, Robert and John.

In 1849, Labatt started a new venture along with several other London businessmen including Thomas Carline called the Proof Line Road Joint Stock Company.  The company built a road that linked London and the northern hinterlands. Upon completion, the road had three tollgates.

Beyond the brewery, Labatt was a town councillor for Saint David's Ward from 1850 to 1851 and a founding member of the London Board of Trade (which is now The London Chamber of Commerce), as well as the founder of the London and Port Stanley Railway.

Upon his death, his son John Labatt purchased the brewery, which grew to become one of the largest in Canada.

See also
 John Labatt Centre
 John Molson

References

External links
 Biography at the Dictionary of Canadian Biography Online
 Labatt's

1803 births
1866 deaths
Pre-Confederation Canadian businesspeople
Irish emigrants to pre-Confederation Ontario
People from County Laois
Businesspeople from London, Ontario
Persons of National Historic Significance (Canada)
Canadian company founders
Canadian farmers
Labatt Brewing Company
Immigrants to Upper Canada